The Inner Mongolia Radio Broadcasting Network was a radio broadcasting network headquartered in Hohhot, Inner Mongolia Autonomous Region of the People's Republic of China. It was founded in 1950 as Inner Mongolia People's Broadcasting Station. In June 2016 it merged with NMTV.

List of programmes

External links
 www.nmrb.com.cn
 Directory of FM radio stations in the region Nei Mongol

Radio in China
Mass media in China
Mass media in Hohhot